Rolando Maran (born 14 July 1963) is an Italian football manager who was most recently the head coach of Pisa.

His playing career as a defender was spent mostly with Chievo. He then managed several Serie B clubs, and after losing the promotion play-off final with Varese in 2012, had his first Serie A job with Catania.

Maran led Catania to a best-ever 8th place in his first season. Also in the top-flight, he had four seasons in charge of Chievo before leading Cagliari from 2018 to 2020.

Playing career 
Maran played for Benacense Riva, Chievo, Valdagno, Carrarese and Fano. He spent nine years at Chievo from 1986 to 1995.

Coaching career

Serie B 
After retiring as a player in 1997, Maran started his coaching career in 1997 at his former side Chievo as a coach, he joined Brescia as a youth coach in 1998 and stayed there for two years before becoming the youth coach at Cittadella in 2000. Two years later, he became that club's first-team manager.

Maran became manager of newly relegated Serie B club Brescia on 5 July 2005 on a one-year contract. The following 5 March, with the team in 5th, he was replaced by Zdenek Zeman.

He joined Serie B club Bari in 2006, where he was sacked and replaced by Giuseppe Materazzi in February 2007 with the team in 13th.

Maran joined Triestina in June 2007, and two years later he joined fellow Serie B side Vicenza. He helped them avoid relegation. On 15 June 2010, his contract was extended for a further two years, but he was dismissed just under a year later.

In October 2011, Maran joined struggling Varese, replacing Benito Carbone as head coach. He led them to the playoffs; however they lost out on promotion to Serie A to Sampdoria, 4–2 on aggregate.

Serie A years 
On 11 June 2012, Maran joined Serie A club Catania. He took them to 8th place in a record-breaking season where they accrued 56 points from 38 matches. The season also saw Catania take a record number of home wins in one season, its record number of victories overall in a single top flight campaign, as well as its record points total in Serie A for the fifth consecutive season.

Maran was dismissed on 20 October 2013 after a 1–2 loss to Cagliari that left Catania in the relegation zone, and replaced by Luigi De Canio. He returned on 15 January, before being sacked for the second time later on 6 April, after five defeats in a row and with the team bottom of the league.

On 19 October 2014, Maran was named new head coach of former club Chievo, replacing Eugenio Corini. He was sacked on 29 April 2018, weeks before the end of his contract; the team was on the brink of the relegation zone having taken 11 points from the last 21 games.

On 7 June 2018, Maran was appointed manager of Cagliari on a two-year contract. His side won seven of their first 12 games to challenge for a Champions League place in November; the only time the Sardinians had started so well was when they won the league for the only time in 1969–70. This form did not continue into the second half of the season, and on 3 March 2020, he was fired by Cagliari after a run of 12 consecutive games without a league win.

On 26 August 2020, Maran signed a two-year contract with Genoa. On 21 December 2020, Maran was sacked.

Back to Serie B: Pisa 
On 23 June 2022, Serie B club Pisa announced to have hired Maran as their new head coach. He was however sacked on 19 September 2022, leaving Pisa at the bottom of the league table after six games.

Managerial statistics

References

1963 births
Living people
Sportspeople from Trento
Association football defenders
Italian footballers
Italian football managers
A.C. ChievoVerona players
Carrarese Calcio players
Alma Juventus Fano 1906 players
Serie A players
Serie B players
Serie C players
A.S. Cittadella managers
Brescia Calcio managers
S.S.C. Bari managers
U.S. Triestina Calcio 1918 managers
L.R. Vicenza managers
S.S.D. Varese Calcio managers
Catania S.S.D. managers
A.C. ChievoVerona managers
Cagliari Calcio managers
Pisa S.C. managers
Serie A managers
Serie B managers
Serie C managers
Footballers from Trentino-Alto Adige/Südtirol